The 1978 Soviet football championship was the 47th seasons of competitive football in the Soviet Union, the 41st among teams of masters. Dinamo Tbilisi won the Top League championship becoming the Soviet domestic champions for the second time.

Honours

Notes = Number in parentheses is the times that club has won that honour. * indicates new record for competition

Soviet Union football championship

Top League

First League

Second League (playoffs)

 [Nov 10, Nov 15]
 Metallist Kharkov      1-0 0-1  Fakel Voronezh     
 Traktor Pavlodar       0-1 0-2  Zvezda Perm 
 Spartak Nalchik        2-0 0-1  Alga Frunze

Top goalscorers

Top League
 Georgiy Yartsev (Spartak Moscow) – 19 goals

First League
Sergei Andreyev (SKA Rostov-na-Donu), Aleksandr Ploshnik (Kuban Krasnodar) – 20 goals

References

External links
 1978 Soviet football championship. RSSSF